That'll Work is the fourth studio album by American blues pianist Johnnie Johnson and American country rock band The Kentucky Headhunters. It was released in August 1993 via Nonesuch Records.

The members of The Kentucky Headhunters wrote all twelve songs on the album with Johnson over the course of twelve days.

Critical reception
Thom Owens of Allmusic rated the album 2 stars out of 5, saying that "They certainly can work a heavy, bluesy groove with dexterity, but they lack the gonzo charm they had on their debut, Pickin' on Nashville — there simply isn't the sense of careening fun, nor is there the reckless fusions that resulted in such an invigorating listen."

Track listing
All songs written by The Kentucky Headhunters and Johnnie Johnson.
"That'll Work" — 4:02
"Sunday Blues" — 4:45
"Johnnie's Breakdown" — 2:04
"I'm Not Runnin'" — 5:58
"Bummed About Love" — 2:17
"Stumblin'" — 3:24
"Back to Memphis" — 5:14
"The Feel" — 3:16
"I Know You Can" — 5:12
"She's Got to Have It" — 4:09
"Derby Day Special" — 3:06
"Tell Me Baby" — 5:17

Personnel
Compiled from liner notes.
The Kentucky Headhunters
 Anthony Kenney — bass guitar
 Greg Martin — lead guitar, slide guitar
 Mark S. Orr — lead vocals
 Fred Young — drums, percussion
 Richard Young — rhythm guitar
Additional musicians
 Jimmy Hall — saxophone, harmonica; background vocals on "Stumblin'" and "Back to Memphis"
 Johnnie Johnson — piano; lead vocal on "That'll Work" and "I Know You Can"
Technical
 Mike Bradley — mixing, recording
 John Dickson — assistant engineer
 Mitchell Fox — executive producer
 The Kentucky Headhunters — production, arrangement
 Glen Knight — executive producer
 Howie Weinberg — mastering

References

1993 albums
Johnnie Johnson (musician) albums
The Kentucky Headhunters albums
Nonesuch Records albums
Collaborative albums